Jackson Square Historic District is an area in downtown San Francisco, California. It dates back to the city's earliest years and the 1849 gold rush, and is known for its historic commercial buildings in the classical revival and Italianate styles.

The Jackson Square Historic District was added to the National Register of Historic Places in November 18, 1971, with periods of significance spanning from 1850 to 1924.

Definition
Jackson Square Historic District is bounded approximately by Broadway on the north, Washington Street on the south, Columbus Ave. on the west and Sansome Street on the east. Jackson Street runs through it.

According to the 2010 neighborhoods map of the San Francisco Association of Realtors (SFAR), Jackson Square Historic District lies within the Financial District/Barbary Coast neighborhood. However, according to a 2006 definition by the city mayor's Office of Neighborhood Services, the area forms part of the North Beach neighborhood.

History

Jackson Square encompasses the northeastern part of the former Barbary Coast red light district. It contains several buildings that survived the 1906 earthquake.  

Hotaling Place, a one-block lane near the end of Columbus Avenue that used to lie on the city's shoreline, has been called, "San Francisco's oldest alley." It is named after businessman Anson Parsons Hotaling, who maintained a warehouse on the lane for his whiskey, which may have helped saving the building in the 1906 earthquake and fire, as commemorated in a poem by Charles K. Field that today is displayed on a plaque there:

"If, as they say, God spanked the town,
For being over-frisky,
Why did He burn His churches down
And spare Hotaling's Whiskey?"

Notable buildings and historical locations 

 Colombo Building, 1-21 Columbus Avenue
 Fugazi Bank Building, 4 Columbus Avenue
 Grogan-Lent-Atherton Building, 400 Jackson Street
 Ghirardelli Building, 407 Jackson Street
 Hotaling Building, 451 Jackson Street
 Hotaling Annex East, 445 Jackson Street
 Hotaling Annex West, 463–473 Jackson Street
 California Masonic Lodge No. 1, 728 Montgomery Street
 Golden Era Building, 732–734 Montgomery Street
 First Jewish religious services in San Francisco, 735 Montgomery Street
 Bank of Lucas, Turner & Co., NE corner of Montgomery and Jackson

References

External links

Neighborhoods in San Francisco
Historic districts on the National Register of Historic Places in California
National Register of Historic Places in San Francisco
San Francisco Designated Landmarks